Jaghneh Hazrati (also Romanized as Jaghneh Ḩaẕratī; also known as Jaghneh Āstāneh and Bāgheshak) is a village in Darzab Rural District, in the Central District of Mashhad County, Razavi Khorasan Province, Iran. At the 2006 census, its population was 302, in 70 families.

References 

Populated places in Mashhad County